Richard LaVon Johnson (born October 19, 1961) is a former professional American football player who played wide receiver in the National Football League (NFL) for three seasons for the Washington Redskins and Detroit Lions. Previously, he played with the Denver Gold and the Houston Gamblers of the United States Football League (USFL).  He played college football at the University of Colorado.

1961 births
Living people
American football wide receivers
Los Angeles Harbor Seahawks football players
Colorado Buffaloes football players
Washington Redskins players
Detroit Lions players
Houston Gamblers players
Players of American football from Los Angeles